Fourth World, Vol. 1: Possible Musics is an album by Jon Hassell and Brian Eno. It was recorded at Celestial Sounds in New York City and released in 1980 by Editions EG, an imprint label of E.G. Records. "Fourth world music" is a musical aesthetic described by Hassell as "a unified primitive/futuristic sound combining features of world ethnic styles with advanced electronic techniques." Upon its release, the album received praise from a variety of critics.

Music
Hassell's trumpet is the dominant instrument on the whole album.

Handclaps are used as percussion in "Griot", which was recorded live at the Art Gallery of Ontario.

"Rising Thermal" repeats a 4-note, tape-looped trumpet with a heavily treated trumpet over the top that sounds like a human voice. "Charm (Over 'Burundi Cloud')", which took up the whole second side of the original LP release, is based on some of the longer pieces of Hassell's 1977 album "Vernal Equinox" (1). The trumpets feature a reverse echo.

The album's cover photo is a Landsat photo of the area south of Khartoum in Sudan. The map coordinates in "Rising Thermal" ("14°16'N, 32°28'E") translate to the area shown in the photo. The river is the White Nile, which is also the name of a Sudanese state.

Eno took what he learned from making this album and put it to use in his collaboration with David Byrne, My Life in the Bush of Ghosts. Hassell apparently considered that album too "commercial", and castigated Eno in Andy Warhol's Interview magazine for his methods and "lack of musical pedigree". Eventually, they were reconciled.

Critical reception 

At the end of 1980, Fourth World, Vol. 1 was named one of the year's ten best albums by many critics, including Robert Palmer from The New York Times. Village Voice critic Robert Christgau ranked it sixth on his year-end list for the Pazz & Jop poll. In Christgau's Record Guide: The '80s (1990), he deemed the record "ambient esoteric kitsch" that was "the most seductive (and best) thing Eno's put his name on since Another Green World". Clyde Macfarlane from The Quietus was even more impressed, writing that the album's five "brilliant" recordings channel "some deep psychological urges", "breathe excitement, and are underlined by a heart-pumping, stick-whacking, distinctly human pulse." According to Ann Powers in the Spin Alternative Record Guide (1995), Fourth World, Vol. 1 "pioneered the syncretic approach to world music with which so many artists experimented during the '80s".

Track listing

Side one
"Chemistry" (Jon Hassell, Brian Eno) – 6:50
"Delta Rain Dream" (Hassell, Eno) – 3:26
"Griot (Over 'Contagious Magic')" (Hassell) – 4:00
"Ba-Benzélé" (Hassell) – 6:15
"Rising Thermal 14° 16' N; 32° 28' E" (Hassell, Eno) – 3:05

Side two
"Charm (Over 'Burundi Cloud')" (Hassell) – 21:29

Personnel

Musicians 
Individual expressions specific to the album credits are set in italics. 
 Jon Hassell – trumpet, Prophet 5 touches on "Delta Rain Dream", "Aluar" loop on "Rising Thermal", ARP loops on "Charm"
 Brian Eno – background cloud guitars on "Delta Rain Dream", Prophet 5 "Starlight" background on "Ba-Benzélé", high altitude Prophet on "Rising Thermal", rare MiniMoog & treatments on "Charm"
 Percy Jones – bass on "Chemistry"
 Naná Vasconcelos – ghatam, congas, loop drum
 Aïyb Dieng – ghatam, congas
 Michael Brook – bass on "Griot"
 Paul Fitzgerald, Gordon Philips, Andrew Timar and Tina Pearson – handclaps on "Griot"
 Jerome Harris – bass on "Ba-Benzélé"
 Night Creatures of Altamira (field recording) on "Rising Thermal"

Additional personnel
 Michael Jay  – engineer
 Peter Sobol – assistant engineer
 Greg Calbi – mastering
 Cream – cover
 William Coupon – Hassell photo
 Roberta Bayley – Eno photo

Release history

See also
 Dream Theory in Malaya: Fourth World Volume Two

References

Further reading

External links
 

Brian Eno albums
1980 albums
Albums produced by Brian Eno
E.G. Records albums
Collaborative albums
Jon Hassell albums